On July 7, 2006, the FBI announced that they had foiled a plot that was in its "talking phase" by foreign militants to detonate explosives in the  tunnels connecting New Jersey with Manhattan and drown the New York Financial District with a torrent of water. This was unfeasible because the tunnel is embedded in bedrock, and the target is above sea level.

Some U.S. counterterrorism officials cast doubt on the significance of the alleged plot and some authorities questioned the breaking news first reported by James Gordon Meek in New York's Daily News, that terrorists sought to flood Lower Manhattan and the Financial District by bombing tunnels. They said there was no evidence that the plotters had taken any actions, such as buying explosives or sending money. Two U.S. counterterrorism officials, speaking to the Washington Post, discounted the ability of the conspirators to carry out an attack.  The report, however, made international news. The government initially protested about how the story was leaked to the New York Daily News.

Suspects

Assem Hammoud

Born July 6, 1975, Assem Hammoud was said to be the leader of the plotters, and is accused of having links to extremist groups since 1994.

He had studied finance and economics at Concordia University in Montreal, Quebec from 1995 to 2002, graduating with a Bachelor of Commerce degree, before returning to Beirut where he became a professor of economics or computer science at the Lebanese International University.

His girlfriend lives in Canada, and one of his two brothers is still studying in Canada, while the other lives in Beirut along with his mother Nabila Qotob. Nabila has denied Assem's involvement with Al-Qaeda

He speaks English, French, Arabic and German, and drives a 1965 MG. In online communities, he went by the moniker Amir Andalousi, a term referring to a Spanish prince, when it was still a Muslim territory. His family is thought to have migrated to Lebanon from Spain in the year 800.

He was arrested by Lebanese authorities in May or June 2006, while waiting for a Canadian Visa.
English media press reports on March 17, 2009 stated that he had appeared on Lebanese television and had been released on bail in June, 2008 (with the information only now coming out).

Others
Other alleged co-conspirators were described as a Saudi, a Yemeni, a Jordanian, a Palestinian and an Iranian, all of whom are still at large.  Two other suspects are in custody. None of the eight men had ever met in person.

Planning
The majority of the planning for the attacks was said to have taken place in "extremely vague" messages sent between online user accounts on a website, which the FBI claims were a form of secret code. They began monitoring discussion in online chat rooms.

Authorities said that the plot was far from complete, but was expected to be scheduled for October or November 2006. The New York Daily News reported that the plot hoped to blow up the Holland Tunnel and cause extensive flooding through lower Manhattan, but authorities have denied that the Holland Tunnel was the specific target.

The Lebanese Internal Security Forces released a statement from Hammoud's confession in which he said he was acting "on a religious order from bin Laden", and that said he had sent his colleagues maps and details about the means to perpetrate the attack and had planned to travel to Pakistan for a four-month training program.  In 2003, Hammoud had met with a Syrian who took him to Ain al-Hilweh, a Palestinian refugee camp in Lebanon, to practice with weapons.

In 2005, Hammoud met with a foreign man who asked Hammoud to provide weapons and shelter to mujahideen.

Plot foiled
Michael Chertoff said that there "was never a concern that (the plot) would actually be executed", and that by the time the news was released to the public on July 7, 2006, the plot was entirely foiled.

References

External links
Press release from FBI
Executive speech from director of FBI April 26, 2006 referring to another foiled tunnel plot
CNN report with interviews with Mark Mershon

Terrorist incidents in the United States in 2006
Explosions in 2006
Failed terrorist attempts in New York City
Islamic terrorism in New York (state)
2006 in New York City
Hudson River
Holland Tunnel